Zapytiv is an urban-type settlement in Lviv Raion of Lviv Oblast in Ukraine. It belongs to Novyi Yarychiv settlement hromada, one of the hromadas of Ukraine. Population: 

Until 18 July 2020, Zapytiv belonged to Kamianka-Buzka Raion. The raion was abolished in July 2020 as part of the administrative reform of Ukraine, which reduced the number of raions of Lviv Oblast to seven. The area of Kamianka-Buzka Raion was split between Chervonohrad and Lviv Raions, with Zapytiv being transferred to Lviv Raion.

Economy

Transport
Zapytiv railway station, located in the settlement, is on the railway which connects Lviv with Kovel via Chervonohrad and Volodymyr and with Lutsk.

The settlement is on Highway M06 connecting Lviv and Kyiv.

References

Urban-type settlements in Lviv Raion